Olof Lavesson, born in 1976, is a Swedish politician of the Moderate Party. He was member of the Riksdag from 2006 to 2018. He is openly gay.

References

External links 
Riksdagen: Olof Lavesson (m)

Members of the Riksdag from the Moderate Party
Living people
1976 births
Gay politicians
Swedish LGBT politicians
LGBT legislators
21st-century Swedish politicians